Patrick Torry (1763–1852) was a Scottish Anglican bishop who served as a bishop in the Scottish Episcopal Church during the first half of the 19th century.

Early life and family 
He was born in King Edward, Aberdeenshire on 27 December 1763, son of Thomas Torry and Jane Watson. He married twice, firstly in 1787 to Christian Kilgour (died 11 May 1789), daughter of the Rt Revd Robert Kilgour, Bishop of Aberdeen, and secondly in September 1791 to Jane Young, daughter of William Young and Ann Gordon. He had three sons and three daughters. His eldest son, John Torry (1800–1879), was incumbent of Coupar Angus and Dean of St Andrews, Dunkeld and Dunblane.

Ecclesiastical career 
He was ordained in the Anglican ministry as a deacon in 1782 and a priest in 1783. His first pastoral appointment was as the incumbent at Arradoul and Fochabers from 1782 to 1789, followed by incumbent at Peterhead from 1789 to June 1837.

He was consecrated as Bishop of Dunkeld and Dunblane at Aberdeen on 12 October 1808 by Primus Skinner, with bishops Macfarlane and Jolly serving as co-consecrators. His united sees were merged with the bishopric of Fife in 1837, with the combined episcopal title was renamed to Bishop of St Andrews, Dunkeld and Dunblane in 1844.

With assistance of the Reverend Alexander Lendrum, Incumbent of Muthill, he produced a Scottish Prayer Book in 1851 which was censured by the College of Bishops of the Scottish Episcopal Church.

He died in office at Peterhead on 3 October 1852, aged 88, and was buried at St Ninian's Cathedral, Perth.

References

Bibliography

External links
Bibliographic directory from Project Canterbury

|-

|-

|-

1763 births
1852 deaths
19th-century Scottish Episcopalian bishops
Bishops of Dunkeld (Episcopal Church of Scotland)
Bishops of Dunblane
Bishops of Saint Andrews, Dunkeld and Dunblane
People from Aberdeenshire